Little Marcle is a village and civil parish  east of Hereford, in the county of Herefordshire, England. In 2011 the parish had a population of 152. The parish touches Aylton, Dymock, Ledbury and Much Marcle. Little Marcle shares a parish council with Aylton, Munsley and Pixley called "Pixley and District Parish Council".

Landmarks 
There are 18 listed buildings in Little Marcle. Little Marcle has a church called St Michael & All Angels. There was previously another church on the site of All Angels which may have been part of Little Marcle deserted medieval village.

History 
The name "Marcle" means 'Boundary wood/clearing', the "Little" part to distinguish from Much Marcle. Little Marcle was recorded in the Domesday Book as Merchelai.

References

External links 

 

Villages in Herefordshire
Civil parishes in Herefordshire